Guillermo Josué Benítez Espinosa (born 5 March 1999) is a Panamanian international footballer who plays for Plaza Amador, as a left back.

Career
Benítez was born in Panama City and began his career with Plaza Amador. He signed on loan for Atlanta United 2 in January 2019.

He made his international debut for Panama in 2019.

References

1999 births
Living people
Panamanian footballers
Panama international footballers
C.D. Plaza Amador players
Atlanta United 2 players
Association football fullbacks
Panamanian expatriate footballers
Panamanian expatriate sportspeople in the United States
Expatriate soccer players in the United States
USL Championship players
Sportspeople from Panama City
Panama under-20 international footballers